Kenneth Michael "Kenny" Ardouin (born 7 May 1991) is an advocate for those affected by cleft lip and palate and lives in London, England. He is well known for his role in supporting those affected in New Zealand, the United Kingdom and around the world, by cleft lip and palate. He is also well known as a radio journalist and presenter in Christchurch, New Zealand.

Early life
Ardouin was born in Hastings and grew up near Rye, East Sussex, England with his family before emigrating to Christchurch, New Zealand in 2000. He received most of his early treatment at one of the world's leading cleft hospitals, Queen Victoria Hospital in East Grinstead before moving to New Zealand. Ardouin attended Linwood College in Christchurch where he held the office of Student Representative on the Board of Trustees from 2006–2009.

Career
Ardouin first became involved with Cleft New Zealand in September 2005 when he founded Cleft Kids New Zealand. Cleft Kids New Zealand was designed to support young people in New Zealand affected by cleft lip and palate as no such other service for young people existed at the time. Ardouin continued to be involved with the cleft community of New Zealand, with Cleft Kids New Zealand merging with the former Cleft Lip and Palate Support Group (Auckland) Inc to form the new Cleft New Zealand which was opened in late 2009 by Mayor Len Brown. He has continued to be involved with various projects including the 2010 Santa Run, the 2012 roadshow and Ardouin participated in the 2012 Tough Guy Challenge to raise funds and awareness for cleft. Ardouin was elected to the Board of Governors in May 2012 and took over as chief executive officer in late 2012, endeavouring to continue to raise the awareness of cleft in New Zealand and advocate against bullying by educating the public on the condition. In December 2013, Ardouin was heavily involved in the organisation and delivery of Australasia's inaugural youth camp which took place in Auckland, New Zealand, for young people affected by cleft lip and palate and featured a guest appearance via Skype from Carmit Bachar, former member of The Pussycat Dolls. A youth camp had been an aspiration of Ardouin's for many years and he later described the camp as 'a dream come true'.

As at August 2018, Ardouin has given over 60 presentations on cleft lip and palate. He has presented on a range of different topics relating to cleft lip and palate in both English and French, including to speech therapists from the Ministry of Education (New Zealand) and to students at the University of Otago. In April 2014, his two most well-known presentations 'Rabbits, Forklifts & Geodes: An Introduction to Cleft Lip and Palate, Possible Causes and the impact on quality of life' and 'It Gets Better: Dealing with Bullying' were streamed to the world through a live YouTube stream, which proved popular around the world and allowed people to access education on cleft lip and palate regardless of where they reside, as part of Ardouin's commitment to sharing resources across international borders. Another initiative of Ardouin's to support cleft care in other countries is the Bottles for Indonesia Programme. Following more than 10 years with the organisation, Ardouin's resignation from Cleft New Zealand was announced on 16 October 2015, and he left his position as Chief Executive Officer on 24 December 2015 in order to accept an undisclosed external position. In early 2018, Ardouin commenced a three-year contract with the Cleft Lip and Palate Association (CLAPA) in the United Kingdom working on improving care and support services for people in adulthood who were born with a cleft.

Radio career
Ardouin commenced as a radio presenter with Volcano Radio 88.5FM Lyttelton in December 2008 with his first programme, Heading Home with Kenny. The show was an afternoon programme known for playing mainstream pop music, and ran for approximately 18 months before Ardouin moved to host a new breakfast show Seismic Shift. Ardouin commenced this programme in September 2010 following the 2010 Canterbury earthquake and was named to reflect the programme's diversity of music and Ardouin's bluntness on current affairs. Although starting out as light-hearted, the Seismic Shift became more poignant following 22 February 2011 Christchurch earthquake which had a devastating effect on the radio station's host town of Lyttelton. Ardouin's programme became more focussed on earthquake recovery at this time, including regular interviews with members of the Earthquake Commission, Christchurch City Council and Prime Minister John Key. Ardouin's programme continued until the city was hit by the June 2011 Christchurch earthquake which caused the closure of Volcano Radio. Ardouin retired from broadcasting at this time, however announced in July 2015 that he will be returning to radio to present a current affairs and investigative journalism programme Wireless Watchdog on Christchurch and Canterbury's Plains FM. The live programme debuted on 6 August 2015 and aired weekly in 2015 on Thursdays at 9pm and Fridays at 11am. Since early 2016, the programme was broadcast fortnightly on alternate Thursdays and Fridays. He is known for promoting equity and equality and challenging those who deny others of this.

Awards & honours
In June 2013, Ardouin was awarded an award from Tony Ryall, Minister of Health for his contribution to youth health services in New Zealand.

Christchurch earthquake book
On 22 February 2012 on the one year anniversary of the Christchurch earthquake, Ardouin released his first book My 22 February which details Ardouin's experiences on 22 February 2011 as the earthquake struck his adopted hometown and destroyed his home. When asked why he wrote the book, Ardouin responded 'my story is not the most scary, horrifying or traumatic story out there about the February earthquake, but to me, 12:51 on Tuesday 22 February is all those things...I still get thrown back to that moment in my mind and it was suggested to me that perhaps if I write down exactly what happened that day, it may help me deal with it.' The dedication at the start of the book reads 'dedicated to all those who will never get a chance to tell their story and to their friends and family who are still picking up the pieces'.

See also
Cleft lip and palate
Plains FM
Volcano Radio 88.5FM Lyttelton

References

1991 births
Living people
People from Hastings
New Zealand journalists
New Zealand radio journalists
New Zealand radio presenters
New Zealand community activists